Barbilophozia barbata is a species of liverwort belonging to the family Anastrophyllaceae.

It is native to Europe and Northern America.

References

Jungermanniales